J. McDaniel Farm is a historic farm located near Newark, New Castle County, Delaware. The property included three contributing buildings. They are a stone house (1826), a stone and frame tri-level barn (c. 1826), and a braced frame outbuilding, used as a garage. The house is a two-story, five bay, gable-roofed, stuccoed stone structure. The barn has a frame upper level and a stone lower level.

It was added to the National Register of Historic Places in 1986. The barn has since been torn down, but the house and garage remain intact.

References

Farms on the National Register of Historic Places in Delaware
Houses completed in 1826
Houses in New Castle County, Delaware
1826 establishments in Delaware
National Register of Historic Places in New Castle County, Delaware